Autodelta is an after-market tuning company for Alfa Romeo cars, founded in 1987 by engineer Jano Djelalian. It is based in the Park Royal industrial area, northwest London, England. The company produces tuning parts and also full bodykits for various Alfa Romeo cars. It also produces full tuned cars including: reworked suspension, tuned engines with turbochargers, superchargers and so on. Autodelta's newest model is Rotrex supercharged Autodelta Brera J5 3.2 C (348 PS, 430 Nm). The Autodelta 147 GTA AM appeared on motoring program Top Gear, setting a 'Power Lap' time of 1 minute 30 seconds. The company is often mixed up with Alfa Romeo's own racing department Autodelta established in 1963.

In 2010 the company's registered name changed to Autodelta (London) Limited.

Lineup

References

External links
 autodelta.co.uk

Alfa Romeo
Auto parts suppliers of the United Kingdom
Manufacturing companies established in 1987
Automotive motorsports and performance companies